The following list of Carnegie libraries in Kentucky provides detailed information on United States Carnegie libraries in Kentucky, where 23 public libraries were built from 15 grants (totaling $795,300) awarded by the Carnegie Corporation of New York from 1899 to 1914. In addition, academic libraries were built at 4 institutions (totaling $101,500). As of 2013, 24 of these buildings are still standing, and 7 still operate as libraries.

Key

Public libraries

Academic libraries

References

Further reading

Note: The above references, while all authoritative, are not entirely mutually consistent. Some details of this list may have been drawn from one of the references (usually Jones) without support from the others.  Reader discretion is advised.

Kentucky
 
Libraries
Libraries